Sharon H. Venne (masko-nôcokwêsiw manitoukan) is a Cree woman from Treaty 6 in Saskatchewan. She is originally from Muskeg Lake Cree First Nation in Saskatchewan. Her publications have been used to write the clauses found in the United Nations Declaration on the Rights of Indigenous Peoples and she has worked to secure a United Nations study on Treaties.

Professional life

Education 
Venne is a PhD candidate in the history department of the University of Alberta. She began her educational career in 1974 with an Arts Certificate from Malaspinia College. She then went on to complete an Honors Bachelor of Arts at the University of Victoria, followed by a Bachelor of Native Law at the University of Saskatchewan and a Bachelor of Law (LLB) at the University of Victoria in 1979. Venne was the first Aboriginal ever to graduate with a Masters of Law degree (LLM) from the University of Alberta in 1987.

Career 
After earning her PhD, Venne was a Professor of Law at the University of Saskatchewan College of Law. She has lectured on the recognition of Indigenous rights under the Western law paradigm and has helped many First Nations in Canada contend self-determination through the implementation of their own traditional legal systems. Since 1981, Venne has been actively involved with the United Nations, serving as a delegate to the Commission on Human Rights for about 13 years. She has attended conferences on the implementation of the International Year for Indigenous Peoples and sat on the Commission on Sustainable Development. The Court for Intergenerational Climate Crimes (CICC), a collaboration between the Dutch artist Jonas Staal and the Indian writer, lawyer, and activist Radha D'Souza, was created by Framer Framed. Venne is one of four judges overseeing the trials.

Awards and achievements 
Her research has been used to write the clauses found in the United Nations Declaration on the Rights of Indigenous Peoples, and She was one of our judges on the Court for Intergenerational Climate Crimes (CICC). She was one of the first Indigenous persons to attend Law School at the University of Victoria in 1976. And was the first Indigenous person ever to graduate with a Masters of Law degree from the University of Alberta.

Publications 

 Sharon Venne (1981) Indian Act and Amendments 1868–1975, University of Saskatchewan.
 Sharon Venne (1990) ‘The New Language of Assimilation: A Brief Analysis of ILO 169’2 Without Prejudice 53.
 Our Elders Understand Our Rights: Evolving international law regarding Indigenous 	Peoples (Source 1) Venne, S. H. (1997). Our Elders Understand Our Rights: Evolving International Law Regarding (Doctoral dissertation, PhD dissertation, University of Alberta). https://www.collectionscanada.gc.ca/obj/s4/f2/dsk2/ftp04/mq21232.pdf
 Venne, S. (2017). How governments manufacture consent and use it against Indigenous Peoples. In Indigenous Peoples as Subjects of International Law (pp. 141-170). Routledge. https://www.taylorfrancis.com/chapters/edit/10.4324/9781315628318-8/governments-manufacture-consent-use-indigenous-peoples-sharon-venne

Personal life 
Venne is by marriage a member of the Blood Tribe within Treaty 7. She is a mother to her son Adam and a grandmother.

External links 

 PhD: https://www.collectionscanada.gc.ca/obj/s4/f2/dsk2/ftp04/mq21232.pdf
 Podcast: https://amp.listennotes.com/top-podcasts/sharon-venne/amp/
 Podcast “Think Indigenous”

References